Cosmópolis is a municipality in the state of São Paulo in Brazil. It is part of the Metropolitan Region of Campinas. The population is 73,474 (2020 est.) in an area of 154.67 km². The elevation is 652 m.

References

Municipalities in São Paulo (state)